Lake Patricia National Wildlife Refuge is an  National Wildlife Refuge (NWR) in the U.S. state of North Dakota. The refuge is an Easement refuge that is entirely on privately owned land, but the landowners and U.S. Government work cooperatively to protect the resources. The U.S. Fish and Wildlife Service oversees Lake Patricia NWR from offices at Audubon National Wildlife Refuge.

References

Protected areas of Morton County, North Dakota
National Wildlife Refuges in North Dakota
Easement refuges in North Dakota